Prince Alexey Mikhailovich Cherkassky or Tcherkassky (1680–1742) was the Chancellor of the Russian Empire in the beginning of Empress Elizabeth's reign.

Life 
Prince Cherkassky stemmed from one of Russia's richest families which descended from the sovereign rulers of Circassia, a relation to Prince Alexander Bekovich-Cherkassky. His surname translates as "Circassian".

In 1702, Prince Cherkassky held a post of senior stolnik (tsar's personal assistant) and was soon assigned to assist his father, Prince Mikhail Yakovlevich Cherkassky, who had been a voivod in Tobolsk at that time. Tcherkassky served under his father for 10 years and in 1714 was summoned to Saint Petersburg. There, he was appointed member of the Urban Construction Commission.

In 1719, Peter the Great sent Aleksey to Siberia as governor. In 1726, he became a senator. During the election of Anna Ivanovna for the Russian throne in 1730, Cherkassky, the richest man in Russia in terms of the amount of serfs he owned at that time, was in charge of the gentry party, which had been in opposition to the verkhovniki (members of the Supreme Privy Council).

For his services to the Crown he was appointed one of the three cabinet ministers and was promoted to the rank of grand chancellor in 1740. As a cabinet minister, Tcherkassky signed a trade agreement with Great Britain in 1734. In his post as chancellor, he signed a treaty with Prussia in 1740 and Great Britain in 1741.

A Baroque palace built for Prince Cherkassky on Palace Quay to Yeropkin's designs has been rebuilt into the Novo-Mikhailovsky Palace.

References

External links

Senators of the Russian Empire
Foreign ministers of the Russian Empire
Chancellors of the Russian Empire
1680 births
1742 deaths
18th-century politicians from the Russian Empire
18th-century diplomats of the Russian Empire